Sascha Siebert (born November 28, 1977) is a German former footballer. He made his debut on the professional league level in the Bundesliga for VfL Bochum on  March 10, 2001 when he came on as a half-time substitute in a game against 1. FC Köln.

References

1977 births
Living people
German footballers
KSV Hessen Kassel players
VfL Bochum players
VfL Bochum II players
SC Paderborn 07 players
SSVg Velbert players
Bundesliga players
Germania Gladbeck players
Association football forwards
SV Lippstadt 08 players